State Route 190 (SR 190) is a 55.3 mile long north-south state highway that traverses the farmland of West Tennessee. It connects Trezevant and South Fulton via Pillowville, Gleason, Palmersville, and Latham.

Route description

SR 190 begins in Carroll County in Trezevant at an intersection with SR 105. It heads north to cross the South Fork of the Obion River to pass through rural areas before entering Weakley County. The highway winds its way north through farmland to pass through the community of Pillowville, where it has an intersection with SR 124. SR 190 then winds its way northeast to enter Gleason, where it passes through town along College Street, N Cedar Street, and E Union Street. It then has an intersection with SR 22 before leaving Gleason and continuing east, then north, to pass through wooded areas, where it crosses a bridge over the Middle Fork of Obion River. The highway has a short concurrency with SR 54 before winding its way northwest to pass through Palmersville, where it has an intersection with SR 89. SR 190 now turns due west as it winds its way through farmland to enter the community of Latham and come to an intersection with SR 118. It turns north along SR 118 to cross the North Fork of the Obion River before turning west again along Chestnut Glade Road. The highway winds it way through farmland for the next several miles as it follows Grissom Road, Vaughn Road, and Ruthville Road before it crosses into Obion County. SR 190 becomes McConnell Road as it turns southwest to come to an end at an intersection with US 45E/SR 43 between South Fulton and Martin. The entire route of SR 190 is a two-lane highway.

Major intersections

References

190
Transportation in Carroll County, Tennessee
Transportation in Weakley County, Tennessee
Transportation in Obion County, Tennessee